Pateando piedras (English: Kicking stones) is the second studio album from the Chilean band Los Prisioneros, released on September 15, 1986 by the label EMI, was the band's first album to be released by a multinational label. Also, it was produced by Jorge González together with Alejandro "Caco" Lyon.

This album, unlike La voz de los '80, which showed a simple sound of guitar, bass and drums, shows techno influences of English bands like Depeche Mode, Heaven 17, or The Cure. Pateando Piedras represented the band's leap to the masses and the defeat of the censorship imposed by the ruling party, by vetoing them on television and in the media controlled by the Military dictatorship. On November 1 and 2, 1986 the group performed two concerts at the Estadio Chile to promote the album.

Background 
In 1985, after the release of their debut album La voz de los '80, Jorge González joined the group with electronic keyboards. According to the accounts of guitarist Claudio Narea, they had become followers of Depeche Mode and other groups that used keyboard as their main instrument. González bought a Casio CZ 101, with lowercase keys, and later bought one like it. With this instrument González composed the songs "¿Quién le tiene miedo a las máquinas?", "Pendiente fuerte de ti", "Ellos dicen no" and "Muevan las Industrias" all of which were premiered in August of that same year at the Teatro Cariola. The last two, "Ellos dicen no" or "Muevan las Industrias" were the only ones that made it onto Pateando Piedras. "Ellos dicen no" was reworked under the name "Por favor".

Recording 
The recording of the album began in the late winter of June 1986.
For the recording of Pateando Piedras, Los Prisioneros again worked with the engineer Caco Lyon, who in this work had a fundamental role. According Narea: «Seven of the songs do not have bass but keyboard bass. All the drums are programmed and three of the songs do not have a guitar». Narea bought two Fender guitars, a Lead 1 and a Deluxe Telecaster, both black; Jorge got himself a Linn drum machine, loaned by Miguel Conejeros from group Pinochet Boys. In addition, three Casio synthesizers and a Simmons electronic drumset were used. While their first record was recorded with an 8-track recorder, their second record was recorded with a 16-track recorder. For this record the sequencers were used as the Voyetra, where it was recorded with a time code that controlled the sequencers leaving 15 free tracks, Lyon noted.

Narea only participated by playing the guitars, he couldn't get used to transitioning from being on a guitar, bass and drums trio to being a techno group, and he never felt comfortable playing the keyboard, so he left sessions early to see his soon-to-become wife, Claudia Carvajal. He played acoustic guitar on the song "El baile de los que sobran". They recorded an initial version of this song, which consisted of a drum machine with bass. At the beginning it didn't have guitar, and the tempo was faster. "Jorge didn't like it, so he recorded it again and asked Claudio to play the guitar. They lowered the tempo and added dog's bark with a Sampler." According to Jorge Gonzalez, without the dog, the issue would not have been bright. "Muevan las Industrias was a recording in which only Jorge participated. "And the gas balloons and all that, he recorded them" Lyon said. They also recorded the song with a Linn Drum, the programmable drums that existed in Chile at the time, he concluded.

Cover 
 
The cover of the album shows to Los Prisioneros on line No. 2 of Santiago Metro heading to the commune of San Miguel. The photoshoot was taken by Jorge Brantmayer. In the original photo, Miguel appears standing with his arms behind his head staring into space. Sitting in front of him, Jorge and Claudio look at the camera. Jorge has an ironic smile and Claudio is laughing happily. At first Jorge González had thought of making the cover green to reflect the South of Chile. However, EMI did not like the idea and the cover ended up being in the "Metro" (Public transport). 

In 1987, during a promotional tour in Buenos Aires, Argentina, Narea related in his book Los prisioneros: biografía de una amistad (The Prisoners: Biography of a friendship), that the cover of "Pateando Piedras" had had a different photo. "It seemed the same except for one small detail: I didn't appear laughing," he said. According to the group's representative, Carlos Fonseca, the original had been lost, so they decided to look for the one closest in the sequence taken a second before or after the other photo to replace it. "It was almost the same, except that in this one I had a lost look," explained Claudio. Later, in Chile, the photograph was also changed. When Pateando Piedras came out on CD, the photo of Claudio was smiling, however, soon after it was replaced with the other one. "In short, the story goes like this: Pateando Piedras was released in September 1986. But already by April 1987 there was another photo. Then in 1991 it re-appeared. Then, in 1992, it got lost again," he concluded. According to Fonseca, Los Prisioneros never liked the Metro photos. At first, Gonzalez suggested to Fonseca that the three of them appear in the photo in a huge green field, and that they see each other in the distance walking. However, EMI rejected the idea since, according to them, it would look like a Los Huasos Quincheros photo.

Release 
This album was released on September 15, 1986, a week after the attack against Pinochet in the Cajón del Maipo, in the middle of a country under "state of siege". The album sold 5,000  copies in the first ten days of its distribution, a record never reached by a youth music group in Chile, later they received their second Platinum record with 20,000 copies sold in two months and 20 days, a sales feat that no artist of the Chilean Nueva ola accomplished.

Later the Chilean band broke a record by filling the Chile Stadium twice in a row, in which a total of 11,000 spectators attended. In addition, the first single to be launched was "Muevan las Industrias". As a result, the media began to take Los Prisioneros more seriously as artists. The magazine Super Rock named Los Prisioneros as the best Chilean band, and in addition Pateando Piedras was awarded  Best Album of the Year. On the other hand,  Jorge González was awarded Best Composer and "El baile de los que sobran" was chosen as the Best Song of the Year. Later, "El baile de los que sobran" was again awarded in Peru, and in Ecuador the song "Sexo" from their debut album was awarded as well.

Critical reception 
In 2006, the album was chosen as one of the most important of the Ibero-American Rock scene, placing Nº 160 on the list, "Los 250 mejores discos de rock iberoamericano" (The 250 best Ibero-American rock albums), published by American magazine Al Borde. In 2008 it was chosen as the 15th-best album on "Los 50 mejores discos chilenos" (The 50 best Chilean albums), according to Rolling Stone Chile magazine.

The musicologist Juan Pablo González considers the album "essential and a turning point in the band's career". He also adds that "It marked a sonorous bridge in the 80s, from an artisanal sound, where the wool of the Chiloé vests and arpeggiated guitars prevailed, towards this world new wave, of technological sounds and very clear texts, where there was no room for metaphors and the political agenda of the time". He's also said that simple things like the barking of a dog on "El Baile de los Que Sobran" genuinely portrayed Chilean society at the time».

Track listing 
Side A

Side B

References

Bibliography

External links 
 Rata.cl: Jorge González desglosa "Pateando piedras" de principio a fin

1986 albums
Los Prisioneros albums
Spanish-language albums